Andrew J. Talley (born April 6, 1943) is a retired American football coach. He served as the head football coach at St. Lawrence University in Canton, New York from 1979 to 1983 and Villanova University from 1985 to 2016, compiling a career college football coaching record of 257–155–2. Talley was hired by Villanova in 1984 to revive the Wildcats football program, which had been dormant since 1980. In 1997, he won the AFCA Coach of the Year Award and the Eddie Robinson Award. Talley led his 2009 Villanova team to an NCAA Division I Football Championship. He is a 1967 graduate of Southern Connecticut State University, where he played college football as a defensive back. Talley was inducted into the College Football Hall of Fame as a coach in 2020.

Head coaching record

See also
 List of college football coaches with 200 wins
 List of college football coaches with 150 NCAA Division I FCS wins

References

External links
 

1943 births
Living people
American football defensive backs
Brown Bears football coaches
Middlebury Panthers football coaches
Springfield Pride football coaches
St. Lawrence Saints football coaches
Villanova Wildcats football coaches
Southern Connecticut State Owls football players
College Football Hall of Fame inductees
High school football coaches in Connecticut
People from Chester County, Pennsylvania
People from Montgomery County, Pennsylvania